Waseem Shaikh (born Waseem Hussain Shaikh on 7 November 1984) is a South African actor of South Asian descent, best known for his role as fisherman and lifeguard, Ashwin Pillay on the SABC 1 TV Series Bay of Plenty.

Born in Dubai, U.A.E. and raised in South Africa, Waseem attended college in Texas, South Africa and Canada, where he currently resides. In 2005, he was crowned Mr. India-South Africa. Later that year, he took up an internship at Lotus FM which continued till 2008, when he relocated to Toronto, where he currently resides.

In 2009, he starred alongside Ashmit Patel, Priyanshu Chatterjee and Vipin Sharma in the independent feature Florida Road.

References

External links
 
 
 
 

South African male television actors
South African male film actors
South African male stage actors
1984 births
Living people
People from Dubai